Johanna Smith was a wooden-hulled schooner that transported lumber along the United States West Coast. She was built near North Bend, Oregon in 1917. She was sold to the Coos Bay Lumber company in 1918, and transported lumber until 1928.

"Built during First World War, shortages prohibited the installation of an engine in the Johanna Smith ... she was used as a barge until 1921, when she became one of only two Pacific Coast steam schooners to be powered by steam turbines."

In 1928, she was converted into a gambling ship, and was moored off Long Beach, California. It was reported to have 13 gaming tables and 38 slot machines operating twenty-four hours a day.

She burned on 22 July 1932. The cause of the fire was never determined.

References

External links
Information on the wreck, from California Wreck Divers

Shipwrecks of the California coast
Lumber schooners
Individual sailing vessels
Barges
Gambling ships
Steamships of the United States
Ships built in North Bend, Oregon
World War I cargo ships of the United States
History of Long Beach, California
Defunct casinos in the United States
Maritime incidents in 1932
1917 ships
Ship fires
Casinos in Los Angeles County, California